Temnosternus is a genus of longhorn beetles of the subfamily Lamiinae.

Species 
Temnosternus contains the following species:
 Temnosternus apicalis Pascoe, 1878
 Temnosternus catulus McKeown, 1942
 Temnosternus dissimilis Pascoe, 1859
 Temnosternus flavolineatus Breuning, 1939
 Temnosternus flavopunctulatus Breuning, 1966
 Temnosternus grossepunctatus Breuning, 1939
 Temnosternus mosaicus Slipinski & Escalona, 2013
 Temnosternus niveoscriptus McKeown, 1942
 Temnosternus ochreopictus (Breuning, 1961)
 Temnosternus pictus (Breuning, 1939)
 Temnosternus planiusculus White, 1855
 Temnosternus quadrituberculatus McKeown, 1942
 Temnosternus subtruncatus (Breuning, 1948)
 Temnosternus undulatus McKeown, 1942
 Temnosternus vitulus Pascoe, 1871

References

Tmesisternini